The All Party Hill Leaders Conference (APHLC) was a political party of the Indian state of Meghalaya. The president of the party was Mr Williamson A. Sangma.

The party had made major gains in the Meghalaya Legislative Assembly from 1970 to 1982. They were in power almost 10 years and the party has given four chief minister to Meghalaya state.
APHLC fought elections and secured 11 out of 15 seats in Assam Legislative Assembly reserved for autonomous hill districts.

References

Political parties in Meghalaya
Political parties with year of establishment missing